Vela Thanthiri Gurunnanselage Karunaratne (born 23 May 1917) was a Ceylonese actor and politician.

Karunaratne was educated at the Government Sinhala School, Rakwana, Maha Bodhi College, Colombo and Government Bilingual school, Matugama.

He was elected to the Parliament of Sri Lanka as first member for Balangoda, representing the Sri Lanka Freedom Party at the 1956 parliamentary election. He contested all the parliamentary elections from 1960 to 1977 from Rakwana, winning the seat at then 1960 March, 1960 July and 1970 elections. He served as Deputy Minister of Posts and Telecommunications in the Second Sirimavo Bandaranaike cabinet.

References

20th-century Sri Lankan actors
Deputy ministers of Sri Lanka
Members of the 3rd Parliament of Ceylon
Members of the 4th Parliament of Ceylon
Members of the 5th Parliament of Ceylon
Members of the 7th Parliament of Ceylon
Sri Lanka Freedom Party politicians
Sinhalese politicians
1917 births

Date of death missing
Year of death missing